The 4th Nova Scotia general election may refer to:

the Nova Scotia general election, 1765, the 4th general election to take place in the Colony of Nova Scotia, for the 4th General Assembly of Nova Scotia
1878 Nova Scotia general election, the 26th overall general election for Nova Scotia, for the (due to a counting error in 1859) 27th Legislative Assembly of Nova Scotia, but considered the 4th general election for the Canadian province of Nova Scotia.